Hladký (feminine Hladká) is a Czech surname meaning "smooth". Notable people with the surname include:
 Anne-Christine Hladky (born 1965), French materials scientist
 Josef Hladký (born 1962), Czech swimmer
 Kip Hladky (born 1960), Canadian field hockey player
 Václav Hladký (born 1990), Czech footballer

See also
 
 Hladki
 Gladki
 Hladkyy

Czech-language surnames